Oscar Beauchemin ( – January 15, 1938) was an American architect, and civil engineer based out of Holyoke, Massachusetts who designed a number of tenements and commercial blocks in the Greater Springfield area, and whose work was prominent in the Main Street architectural landscape of the Springdale neighborhood of Holyoke, Massachusetts.

Beauchemin was born in Quebec around the year 1876, with his family relocating to Holyoke within a year, where he would spend nearly his entire childhood. For the first part of his subsequent career, he was employed by the Merrick Lumber Company. Having a long-held interest in designing buildings, he first became active as an architect in 1903, and opened his own independent firm in 1908.

By the end of his career Beauchemin had become under the employ of Holyoke's municipal engineering department. Throughout his life he was an active member Massachusetts Catholic Order of Foresters and was known to be a competitive candlepin bowler.

Following a period of brief illness, he died in the evening of January 15, 1938 at his home at about the age of 62.

Selected works

While known to have constructed smaller dwellings as well, Beauchemin's works were generally large brick tenements with ground-floor storefronts or offices, done in the neoclassical style. Among features common to his work were festoon-adorned friezes, belt courses and angled windows placed at a corner of the front facade.

 J.R. Smith Block, Holyoke, Massachusetts (1906)
 Bergeron Apartments, Chicopee, Massachusetts (1909)
 The Clinton, Holyoke, Massachusetts (1909)
 Cavagnare Block/736-740 Dwight St., Holyoke, Massachusetts (1909, demolished ) 
 Oakdale Pharmacy Block, Holyoke, Massachusetts (1910)
 The Parkview, Springdale, Holyoke, Massachusetts
 Paquette Block, Springdale, Holyoke, Massachusetts
 Guenther Block, Springdale, Holyoke, Massachusetts
 Wayfinders Dwight/Clinton, Holyoke, Massachusetts (1910), formerly Gauthier Block
 331-335 Main Street, Holyoke, Massachusetts (1911, demolished 1989)
 Choiniere & Beauregard Block, Springfield, Massachusetts (1912, demolished)
Pelott Block, Holyoke, Massachusetts (1912)
 Bijou Theater, Holyoke, Massachusetts (1913, 1916 expansion, demolished)
 Holyoke Transportation Center, Holyoke, Massachusetts (1914), formerly Holyoke Central Fire Station
 Knights of Columbus Building, Holyoke, Massachusetts (1915, demolished)
 M. A. Scannell House, Holyoke, Massachusetts (1915)
 The Colonial/Beauvais Block, Holyoke, Massachusetts (1916)
 Dennis M. Reardon House, South Hadley, Massachusetts (1916)
 Valley Arena Gardens, Holyoke, Massachusetts (1926), noted sports and entertainment venue best known as the site of Rocky Marciano's professional debut

See also
 George P. B. Alderman
 James A. Clough

Notes

References

Date of birth unknown
1938 deaths
20th-century American architects
American candlepin bowling players
19th-century Roman Catholics
20th-century Roman Catholics
American people of French-Canadian descent
Architects from Quebec
People from Holyoke, Massachusetts
1870s births
Canadian emigrants to the United States
Catholics from Massachusetts
Architects from Massachusetts